The Netherlands participated in the Eurovision Song Contest 2004 with the song "Without You" written by Ed van Otterdijk and Angeline van Otterdijk. The song was performed by the duo Re-union. The Dutch broadcaster Nederlandse Omroep Stichting (NOS) organised the national final Nationaal Songfestival 2004 in collaboration with broadcaster Televisie Radio Omroep Stichting (TROS) in order to select the Dutch entry for the 2004 contest in Istanbul, Turkey. 24 entries competed in the national final which consisted of six shows: four semi-finals, a wildcard round and a final. Ten entries qualified from to compete in the final on 22 February 2004 where "Without You" performed by Re-union was selected as the winner following the combination of votes from a five-member jury panel and a public vote.

The Netherlands competed in the semi-final of the Eurovision Song Contest which took place on 12 May 2004. Performing as the closing entry during the show in position 22, "Without You" was announced among the top 10 entries of the semi-final and therefore qualified to compete in the final on 14 May. It was later revealed that the Netherlands placed sixth out of the 22 participating countries in the semi-final with 146 points. In the final, the Netherlands placed twentieth out of the 24 participating countries, scoring 11 points.

Background 

The Dutch least successful result has been last place, which they have achieved on four occasions, most recently in the 1968 contest.

The Dutch national broadcaster, Nederlandse Omroep Stichting (NOS), broadcast the event within the Netherlands and organises the selection process for the nation's entry. The Netherlands has used various methods to select the Dutch entry in the past, such as the Nationaal Songfestival, a live televised national final to choose the performer, song or both to compete at Eurovision. However, internal selections have also been held on occasion. In 2003, NOS, in collaboration with broadcaster Televisie Radio Omroep Stichting (TROS), has organised Nationaal Songfestival in order to select the Dutch entry for the contest, a method that was continued for the 2004 Dutch entry.

Before Eurovision

Nationaal Songfestival 2004 
Nationaal Songfestival 2004 was the national final developed by NOS/TROS that selected the Dutch entry for the Eurovision Song Contest 2004. Twenty-four entries competed in the competition consisting of six shows that commenced with the first of four semi-finals on 22 January 2004, followed by a wildcard round on 19 February 2004 and concluded with a final on 22 February 2004. All shows in the competition took place at the Pepsi Stage in Amsterdam, hosted by Nance Coolen and Humberto Tan and were broadcast on Nederland 2 as well as streamed online via the broadcaster's Eurovision Song Contest website songfestival.nl.

Format 
The format of the national final consisted of six shows: four semi-finals, a wildcard round and a final. The semi-finals each featured six competing entries from which two qualified directly to the final from each show. Six songs advanced to the wildcard round from which two entries advanced to complete the ten-song lineup in the final. Results during the semi-finals, the wildcard round shows and the selection of wildcards were determined by a five-member expert jury and votes from the public. In the semi-finals and the wildcard round, the jury selected one qualifier, while a public televote determined an additional qualifier from the remaining entries. A second round of public televoting took place following each semi-final where the winning song from each of the four shows advanced to the wildcard round. The jury then selected an additional two entries from the remaining non-qualifying acts to advance. The wildcard round qualifiers were revealed during broadcasts of the weekly backstage programme Op weg naar het songfestival. In the final, the winner was selected by the combination of votes from public televoting and a five-member expert jury. Viewers were able to vote via telephone, SMS and online.

The jury panel that voted in all shows consisted of:

 Cornald Maas – journalist
 Daniël Lohues – singer-songwriter, member of the group Skik
 Cor Bakker – musician
 Rob Stenders – radio DJ
 Ruth Jacott – singer and 1993 Dutch Eurovision entrant

Competing entries 
A submission period was opened by the Dutch broadcaster on 17 July 2003 where artists and composers were able to submit their entries until 1 November 2003. 475 submissions were received by the broadcaster at the closing of the deadline, and the twenty-four selected competing entries were announced during a press conference that took place at the Pepsi Stage in Amsterdam on 7 January 2003.

Shows

Semi-finals 
The four semi-finals took place on 22 January, 29 January, 5 February and 12 February 2004. In each semi-final six acts competed and two entries directly qualified to the final. A five-member expert jury first selected one entry to advance, while an additional qualifier was selected by a public televote. An additional six entries advanced to the wildcard round, one per semi-final by an additional round of public televoting that took place between the remaining four entries following each show and two selected by the jury from the twelve non-qualifiers.

Wildcard round
The wildcard round took place on 19 February 2004. Six acts competed and two entries qualified to the final. A five-member expert jury first selected one entry to advance, while an additional qualifier was selected by a public televote from the remaining five entries. Dutch 1969 Eurovision winner Lenny Kuhr was also present during the show as a guest juror.

Final
The final took place on 22 February 2004 where the ten entries that qualified from the preceding four semi-finals and the wildcard round competed. The winner, "Without You" performed by Re-union, was selected by the 50/50 combination of a public televote and the votes of a five-member expert jury. The viewers and the juries each had a total of 255 points to award. Each juror distributed their points as follows: 1, 2, 3, 4, 5, 6, 8, 10 and 12 points. The viewer vote was based on the percentage of votes each song achieved through the following voting methods: telephone and SMS voting. For example, if a song gained 10% of the vote, then that entry would be awarded 10% of 255 points rounded to the nearest integer: 26 points. A record 200,000 votes were cast by the public during the final.

In addition to the performances of the competing entries, the show featured guest performances by the Extention Dancers, Arwin Kluft, Hind, Petra Berger, Belgian 1986 Eurovision winner Sandra Kim and past Dutch Eurovision entrants Mandy Huydts (1986), Maxine (1996), Marjolein Spijkers (1997), Marlayne (1999), Michelle (2001) and Esther Hart (2003).

Ratings

At Eurovision
It was announced that the competition's format would be expanded to include a semi-final in 2004. According to the rules, all nations with the exceptions of the host country, the "Big Four" (France, Germany, Spain and the United Kingdom), and the ten highest placed finishers in the 2003 contest are required to qualify from the semi-final on 12 May 2004 in order to compete for the final on 15 May 2004; the top ten countries from the semi-final progress to the final. On 23 March 2004, a special allocation draw was held which determined the running order for the semi-final and the Netherlands was set to perform last in position 22, following the entry from Bosnia and Herzegovina. At the end of the semi-final, Ukraine was announced as having finished in the top 10 and consequently qualifying for the grand final. It was later revealed that the Netherlands placed sixth in the semi-final, receiving a total of 146 points. The draw for the running order for the final was done by the presenters during the announcement of the ten qualifying countries during the semi-final and the Netherlands was drawn to perform in position 7, following the entry from Malta and before the entry from Germany. The Netherlands placed twentieth in the final, scoring 11 points.

The semi-final and the final was broadcast in the Netherlands on Nederland 2 with commentary by Willem van Beusekom and Cornald Maas as well as via radio on Radio 3FM with commentary by Hijlco Span and Ron Stoeltie. The Dutch spokesperson, who announced the Dutch votes during the final, was 2003 Dutch Eurovision entrant Esther Hart.

Voting 
Below is a breakdown of points awarded to the Netherlands and awarded by the Netherlands in the semi-final and grand final of the contest. The nation awarded its 12 points to Serbia and Montenegro in the semi-final and to Turkey in the final of the contest.

Points awarded to the Netherlands

Points awarded by the Netherlands

References

2004
Countries in the Eurovision Song Contest 2004
Eurovision